Pseudopannaria is a genus of lichenized fungi within the Lecideaceae family. This is a monotypic genus, containing the single species Pseudopannaria marcii.

References

External links
Pseudopannaria at Index Fungorum

Lichen genera
Lecideales genera
Taxa named by Maurice Bouly de Lesdain
Taxa described in 1906